Daqiao is a town of Xihe County in southeastern Gansu province, China, located about  due south of the county seat and  northeast of Longnan. , it has 14 villages under its administration.

See also 
 List of township-level divisions of Gansu

References 

Township-level divisions of Gansu
Xihe County